Namushka Lodge Water Aerodrome  is located on the northeast side of Harding Lake in the Northwest Territories, Canada. It is open from mid-June until October.

References

Registered aerodromes in the North Slave Region
Seaplane bases in the Northwest Territories